Black Arrows is a 2003 EP by the Australian band Full Scale, released with the band's other EP, White Arrows (EP). The EP's were produced by Forrester Savell, and were released through Popstar Records.

Track listing 

 "Crush" - 4:22
 "Where's Your Energy?" - 3:47
 "Feel It" - 5:06
 "Billy (Say What You're Feeling)" - 3:41
 "The Story To Tell Your Children" - 5:23
 "System Of Shame" - 4:32

References 

2003 EPs
Full Scale (band) albums